Schrötter is a German surname. It is a variation of Schröder.

Notable people 
Anton Schrötter von Kristelli (1802–1875), Moravian-Austrian chemist and mineralogist born in Olomouc, Moravia
Friedrich von Schrötter (1743–1815), Junker and Prussian government minister
Hermann von Schrötter (1870–1928), Austrian physiologist and physician who was a native of Vienna
Leopold von Schrötter (1837–1908), Austrian internist and laryngologist born in Graz

German-language surnames
German noble families
German Bohemian noble families
Austrian noble families